Akshay Wadkar (born 9 July 1994) is an Indian cricketer. He made his first-class debut for Vidarbha in the 2017–18 Ranji Trophy on 17 November 2017. On 31 December 2017, in the final of the tournament, he scored his maiden first-class century, batting for Vidarbha against Delhi.

In July 2018, he was named in India Red's squad for the 2018–19 Duleep Trophy, replacing Abhishek Gupta. In August 2019, he was named in the India Green team's squad for the 2019–20 Duleep Trophy.

References

External links
 

1994 births
Living people
Indian cricketers
Cricketers from Nagpur
Vidarbha cricketers
India Red cricketers
Wicket-keepers